Angela Baroni (born 24 March 1979) is an Italian sailor. She competed in the Yngling event at the 2004 Summer Olympics.

References

External links
 

1979 births
Living people
Italian female sailors (sport)
Olympic sailors of Italy
Sailors at the 2004 Summer Olympics – Yngling
People from Rovereto
Sportspeople from Trentino